Weddellite (CaC2O4·2H2O) is a mineral form of calcium oxalate named for occurrences of millimeter-sized crystals found in bottom sediments of the Weddell Sea, off Antarctica. Occasionally, weddellite partially dehydrates to whewellite, forming excellent pseudomorphs of grainy whewellite after weddellite's short tetragonal dipyramids. It was first described in 1936 but only named in 1942.

Structural properties
Weddellite, or calcium oxalate dihydrate, crystallises in a tetragonal system: the classic crystal shape is the eight-face bipyramid. Using bright field microscopy, the weddellite crystals are recognised easily by their shape, reminiscent of a postal envelope. More complex shapes of weddellite are possible; the dumbbell shape is not rare and has no precise angles or sides. This form is, in reality, a microcrystalline agglomerate that takes the shape of a biconcave disc. Weddellite crystals are poorly birefringent and do not show any interference pattern under polarised light.

Biological role
Weddellite crystals are usually of little clinical value. Together, whewellite and weddellite are the most common renal calculi.

Occurrence

Weddellite occurs as authigenic crystals in sea floor mud. It also has been reported in peat bearing sediments and in calcite-bearing lacustrine sediments. It occurs with whewellite, urea, phosphammite and aphthitalite.

If oxalic acid is used to clean any mineral sample that contains calcium, weddellite and whewellite may be occurrenced on the sample.

References 

Calcium minerals
Oxalate minerals
Tetragonal minerals
Minerals in space group 87
Minerals described in 1942